Agecroft power station was a coal-fired power station between the eastern bank of the Manchester, Bolton and Bury Canal and the western bank of the River Irwell at Pendlebury, near Manchester, England. It operated between 1925 and 1993, and was demolished in 1994. HM Prison Forest Bank has since been built on the site.

History
Agecroft Hall, an ancient manor house once occupied a site nearby, between Lumns Lane to the west and the Manchester to Bolton railway line and disused Manchester, Bolton and Bury Canal to the east. It was dismantled by a new owner and shipped to Richmond, Virginia in the USA.

The first power station on the site, Agecroft A Power Station, was formally opened by Alderman G. Billington, the Mayor of Salford, on Wednesday 23 September 1925. It was operated by the Salford Corporation Electricity Department. After nationalisation of the British electricity supply industry in 1948 the station was owned and operated by the British Electricity Authority (1948–1955), then the Central Electricity Authority (1955–1957), finally by the Central Electricity Generating Board (1958–1990).

The station was then extended in 1950 with the construction of a B station and in the 1960s a C station. Agecroft B and C power stations were officially opened in 1962 and the event was commemorated with a plaque.

Specifications

A station
The A station used three 12,500 and one 20,000 kilowatt (kW) Metropolitan-Vickers turbo generators to give a total generating capacity of 57,500 kW.  These were supplied with steam from six Babcock & Wilcox, 65,000 pounds per hour (8.2 kg/s), and two John Thompson, 80,000 lb/hr (10.1 kg/s) boilers. These operated at 325 psi at 720 °F (B&W) and 780 °F (JT). Following the rebuilding of some of the original chain grate coal fired boilers in the A station as oil fired units the needed extra steam capacity required for the 20,000 kW unit was supplied from the B station extra boiler capacity via a steam line several hundred feet in length. The pressure step down valves were located at the B station 

This site still features some original buildings, although most of these are stripped. There was a building marked as a "transformer bay" in site plans, which housed a small control room until recently. This building is also referred to as Agecroft A Substation 

Cooling water was obtained from the River Irwell.

The generating capacity and electricity output of Agecroft A is given in the table.

B and C stations
The B station had four International Combustion Limited  pulverised coal boilers rated at 35,000 lb/hr, steam conditions were 620 psi and a super-heater temperature of 538 °C with reheat to 538 °C. The B station used two Metropolitan-Vickers 55 megawatt (MW) generating sets, these were commissioned in December 1950. An extension to 345 MW was authorised in July 1955. The B station had two hyperbolic Mouchel concrete cooling towers each rated for 3.08 million gallons per hour. The generating capacity and electricity output of Agecroft B is given in the table.

The C Station used two 124 megawatt (MW) Metropolitan-Vickers hydrogen cooled sets giving a total generation capacity of 358 MW across the B and C stations. The turbines were supplied with steam from two 860,000 lb/hr (108.4 kg/s) International Combustion Limited boilers operating at 1500 psi and 1000 °F (103.4 bar and 538 °C). Agecroft C was one of the CEGB's twenty steam power stations with the highest thermal efficiency; in 1963–4 the thermal efficiency was 3.51 per cent, 32.47 per cent in 1964–5, and 32.79 per cent in 1965–6. The electricity output from the C station was as follows:

Operations

The stations used cooling water from the River Irwell and the B and C stations were cooled by four large natural draft cooling towers situated close to the banks of the Irwell.

Three steam locomotives were built by Robert Stephenson and Hawthorns in Newcastle upon Tyne in 1948 to shunt coal wagons at the A station and later the B and C stations. However, with the nationalisation of the UK's electric supply industry, the locomotives became almost entirely redundant as a conveyor belt was constructed to carry coal directly across Agecroft Road (A6044) and into the station from Agecroft Colliery. The colliery continued to supply the stations until its closure in March 1991. Despite this however, locomotives were still used to shunt waggons of coal to and from the colliery. The surplus of locomotives were sold in 1980s. After being retired in 1980, Agecroft No. 1 was saved from scrapping by being bought by a private owner. It was purchased by the Museum of Science and Industry in Manchester in a dismantled state in 2008, where it underwent a 3-year restoration costing £120,000. Agecroft No. 2 was bought by the Ribble Steam Railway and sent to Southport for restorations in December 1982. Agecroft No. 3 is going under full restoration at the Whitwell & Reepham railway station in Norfolk.

Closure and demolition
Agecroft Colliery was closed in March 1991 and the closure of the power station was announced in November 1992. The station closed in March 1993, and demolition commenced later that year. The cooling towers and two main stacks were demolished on 8 May 1994. Their demolition was delayed because a pair of rare peregrine falcons had nested on the site. HM Prison Forest Bank has since been built on the station's site. It houses category B male offenders and was opened in January 2000.

Sometime in December 2019 or January  2020, Agecroft A Substation was stripped of its Art Deco control panels. The reason is unknown, perhaps this represents a step towards demolition.

Cultural use
In 1983, the stations were the subject of a photograph by British landscape photographer John Davies.

See also

Central Electricity Generating Board
Agecroft Colliery
Manchester, Bolton and Bury Canal
River Irwell

References

External links

 Opening Agecroft Power Station 1925
 Agecroft Power Station operating in 1962
 Steeplejacks on Agecroft Power Station's chimney in 1982
 Demolition of Agecroft Power Station's cooling towers and chimneys in 1994
 Interior and external photographs of the stations
 Agecroft's Last Day set on Flickr

Coal-fired power stations in England
Demolished buildings and structures in Greater Manchester
Power stations in North West England
Demolished power stations in the United Kingdom
Former coal-fired power stations in the United Kingdom
Former power stations in England
Energy infrastructure completed in 1925
1925 establishments in England
1993 disestablishments in England
Buildings and structures demolished in 1994
Buildings and structures demolished by controlled implosion